Isaac García (born April 5, 1968) is a retired male long-distance runner from Mexico, who specialized in the marathon. He set his personal best (2:10:54) in the classic distance on April 25, 1995 when he got the third place in Rotterdam.

He represented Mexico in the marathon at the 2001 World Championships in Athletics and he finished in 55th place. He was more successful at regional level: he began with a 10,000 metres silver medal at the 1990 Central American and Caribbean Games and followed it up with another silver at the 1991 CAC Championships. The 1993 Central American and Caribbean Games proved to be the highlight of his career, as he won the 5000 metres gold medal for Mexico, as well as retaining the 10,000 m silver.

Achievements

References

1968 births
Living people
Mexican male long-distance runners
Central American and Caribbean Games gold medalists for Mexico
Competitors at the 1990 Central American and Caribbean Games
Competitors at the 1993 Central American and Caribbean Games
Central American and Caribbean Games medalists in athletics
20th-century Mexican people